It's Trad, Dad! (1962), known in the U.S. as Ring-A-Ding Rhythm, is a British musical comedy featuring performances by a variety of Dixieland jazz bands and rock-and-roll singers. The film was one of the first produced by Amicus Productions, a company known predominantly for horror films. It was director Richard Lester's first feature film.

Plot
Craig (Craig Douglas) and Helen (Helen Shapiro, then 15 years old) are teenagers who enjoy the latest trend of traditional jazz along with their friends. The local mayor and a group of adults dislike the trend and move to have the jukebox in the coffee shop silenced.

With the help of an omniscient narrator, Craig and Helen try to find a disc jockey and organize a show to popularize the music. Their travels take them where the music is: nightclubs, TV studios, and recording companies. They eventually get to see disc jockey Pete Murray and persuade him to attend and arrange for several jazz bands to perform. Murray recruits two other deejays, David Jacobs and Alan Freeman, to join the party. The mayor, upon hearing the news of the upcoming performance, decides to stop the performers' bus by any means necessary.

When the show is scheduled to start, Craig and Helen find that their disc jockey and musicians have not yet arrived, so they perform themselves and are well received by the crowd. The bands' bus manages to evade a series of obstacles set up by the local police, and they arrive and put on the show for the BBC television cameras. The film ends with everyone enjoying the music, including the mayor who has been easily persuaded to take the credit for having arranged a successful show.

Cast

 Helen Shapiro
 Craig Douglas
 John Leyton
 The Brook Brothers
 Chubby Checker
 Del Shannon
 Gary U.S. Bonds (as Gary (U.S.) Bonds)
 Gene Vincent
 Gene McDaniels
 The Paris Sisters (as Paris Sisters)
 The Dukes of Dixieland (as Dukes of Dixieland)
 Chris Barber's Jazz Band with Ottilie Patterson
 Acker Bilk and His Paramount Jazz Band (as Mr. Acker Bilk and His Paramount Jazz Band)
 Kenny Ball and his Jazzmen (as Kenny Ball's Jazzmen)
 Bob Wallis and his Storyville Jazzmen
 Terry Lightfoot and his New Orleans Jazz Band
 The Temperance Seven
 Sounds Incorporated (as Sounds Inc.)
 David Jacobs
 Pete Murray
 Alan Freeman
 Felix Felton as Mayor
 Arthur Mullard as Police Chief
 Deryck Guyler as Narrator

Soundtrack
The film predominantly comprises musical numbers, including performances by the principal actors Helen Shapiro and Craig Douglas themselves. However, unlike traditional "musicals" the songs have little to do with the movie plot. The other performers shown in the cast list were popular acts from both the U.K. and U.S.

References

External links 
 
 
 
 
 

British musical comedy films
1962 films
Films directed by Richard Lester
British black-and-white films
1962 musical comedy films
Amicus Productions films
Columbia Pictures films
1962 directorial debut films
Films scored by Ken Thorne
1960s English-language films
1960s British films